Thomas C. Fairbairn (usually credited as T. C. Fairbairn) was a theatre impresario, particularly known for his productions of Samuel Coleridge-Taylor's Hiawatha.

Fairbairn first produced his dramatised, costumed version of Scenes from the Song of Hiawatha in 1924. Held at the Royal Albert Hall, and featuring the Royal Choral Society, it raised funds for the Royal National Institute for the Blind. The eight performances were so successful that he rebooked the hall and choir for the following year. He repeated the show every year until 1939, apart from 1926, the year of the General Strike. All but the first show featured 1,000 performers, 200 of whom were dancers. The production also toured other venues in the greater London area. 

Fairbairn appeared as a castaway on the BBC Radio programme Desert Island Discs on 18 May 1974.

References 

Year of birth missing
Place of birth missing
Year of death missing
Place of death missing
British theatre managers and producers
Impresarios